Georgia–Russia relations are the bilateral ties between Georgia and the Russian Federation. The two countries have had no formal diplomatic relations since August 2008, largely due to the Russo-Georgian War and Russian recognition of separatist regions. Instead, the Swiss embassy in Tbilisi hosts a Russian interest section, while the interest section of Georgia is hosted in Moscow. 

Bilateral relations between Georgia and Russia date back hundreds of years and remain complicated despite certain religious and historical ties that exist between the two countries and their people. The first formal alliance between Georgia and Russia took place in 1783 when king Heraclius II of Eastern Georgia (Kartli-Kakheti) signed the Treaty of Georgievsk with the Russian Empire, which the Georgian monarchy viewed as a replacement for its long-lost Orthodox ally the Eastern Roman Empire.

Despite Russia's vowing to defend Eastern Georgia, it rendered no assistance when the Persians invaded in 1795, as they sought to reestablish their traditional suzerainty over the region. It was only belatedly that Catherine the Great of Russia put in place punitive measures against Persia, only to be cut short by her death and the enthronement of Paul against the Empress' wishes. Lacking his mother's experience and tactfulness, in December 1800 Paul signed the proclamation on the annexation of Georgia to the Russian Empire, which was finalized by a decree on January 8, 1801, and confirmed by Tsar Alexander I on September 12, 1801. The Georgian ambassador in Russia reacted with a note of protest that was presented to the Russian vice-chancellor Prince Kurakin but despite this, in May 1801 Russian General Carl Heinrich Knorring officially enforced the Russian control of the kingdom and instituted a government headed by General Ivan Petrovich Lasarev. By this, Persia officially lost control over the Georgian lands it had been ruling for centuries.

The Georgian nobility did not accept the decree until April 1802 when General Knorring surrounded the nobility in Tbilisi's Sioni Cathedral and forced them to take an oath on the Imperial Crown of Russia. Those who disagreed were temporarily arrested. This was followed by the dethronement and exile of the Georgian monarch, as well as the head of the church, to St Petersburg in what was viewed in Georgia as violation of the Georgievsk Treaty.

Having spent more than a century as part of the Russian Empire, in 1918 Georgia regained independence and established the First Republic. In 1921 Georgia was invaded and occupied by Bolshevik Russia to form the Soviet Union in 1922. Georgian Joseph Stalin was the leader of the USSR from 1928-1953. When the country regained independence in 1991, the bilateral Russo-Georgian ties were once again strained due to Moscow's support of the separatist regions within Georgia, Georgia's independent energy policies and most recently, its intentions to join NATO.

On August 29, 2008, in the aftermath of the Russo-Georgian War, Deputy Foreign Minister Grigol Vashadze announced that Georgia had broken diplomatic relations with Russia. He also said that Russian diplomats must leave Georgia, and that no Georgian diplomat would remain in Russia, while only consular relations would be maintained. Russian foreign ministry spokesman Andrei Nesterenko said that Russia regretted this step.

Comparison

Post-independence relations (1992–2003)

War in Abkhazia (1992-1993)

The tensions between Georgia and Russia, which had been heightened even before the collapse of the Soviet Union, climaxed during the secessionist conflict in Abkhazia in 1992–93. Support for the Abkhaz from various groups within Russia such as the Confederation of Mountain Peoples of the Caucasus and Cossacks, as well as Russian regular military units stationed in Abkhazia, contributed to the worsening of the Georgia-Russia relations.

On 3 September, 1992, Russia invited both sides of the conflict to take part in the negotiations in Moscow. Formally, it was a negotiation between Russia and Georgia, two sovereign states. However, it served as a forum for Abkhaz and Georgian sides to discuss the ongoing conflict, while Russia saw its role as a mediator, not a party. Russian president Boris Yeltsin and Head of State Council of the Republic of Georgia Eduard Shevardnadze signed an agreement, formally known as Summary Document of the Moscow Meeting. According to the agreement, a Monitoring and Inspection Commission, composed of representatives appointed by the authorities of Georgia, including Abkhazia, and Russia should have been established. Russian military forces stationed in Abkhazia should have maintained neutrality throughout the conflict. The Abkhaz militias should have been disbanded. Only the agreed level of Georgian troops should have remained in the conflict zone required for the protection of the railway and certain other installations. 

Georgian troops began leaving the conflict area. In the meantime, however, on September 25 the Supreme Council of the Russian Federation adopted a resolution proposed by Sergey Baburin, which denounced Georgia's policy in Abkhazia. Russia suspended the delivery of weapons and equipment to Tbilisi. Georgia's leadership identified this resolution as interference in Georgia's internal affairs. The resolution is considered to have encouraged an Abkhaz offensive in October in violation of the September 3 agreement. However, the Abkhaz side blamed Georgia for violating the ceasefire first and claimed that it only acted in self-defense. 

After the Battle of Gagra in October 1992, the military operations resumed. Shevardnadze denounced "reactionary forces" in Russia for encouraging the Abkhaz offensive. Yeltsin rejected Georgian charges of Russian interference in Georgia's internal affairs, but warned that Russia will take action if Russian lives and property are threatened.

On 17 December, 1992, the Georgian parliament blamed the Russian Federation for interfering in the Georgia's internal affairs. It noted that Russian troops took part in bombing of Sokhumi and its outskirts on 2 and 9 December. They have also dawned a helicopter of Georgian air forces on 5 October and Georgia's Su-25 on 13 October. Other facts concerning Russian involvement in the conflict were also mentioned. It was the first occasion when Georgia officially noted that Russian armed forces stationed in Abkhazia were involved in the conflict on the Abkhaz side and fought against the territorial integrity of Georgia.

On 2 November, Georgian units seized a Russian arms depot in southern Georgia. Russian parliament adopted a resolution on 25 December, 1992. It blamed Georgia for violating the terms of agreement concerning legal status of Russian armed forces on territory of Republic of Georgia. It recommended Russian president and government to impose sanctions on Georgia if Georgia failed to maintain security of Russian citizens and property of Russian Federation on the territory of Republic of Georgia.

During the battle of Gumista on 16 March 1993, Georgian side accused the Russian airforce of supporting the Abkhaz offensive. On 17 March Georgian parliament addressed the UN, European parliament, world parliaments and Supreme Soviet of the Russian Federation. It demanded the withdrawal of Russian forces from Abkhazia and stated that Russia waged "an undeclared war" against Georgia. Russian side denied involvement in the conflict.

During the March 19 air raid on Sokhumi, Georgian forces succeeded in downing an SU-27 fighter-bomber. A UN military observer confirmed that the aircraft belonged to the Russian air forces. The Georgian side once again blamed Russia for aiding the Abkhaz. 

On April 1, Georgian Parliament adopted a resolution which openly blamed Russia in political facilitation of ethnic cleansing and genocide against Georgians.

On April 6-9, negotiations were held between Russia and Georgia. The topic of withdrawal of Russian armed forces from Abkhazia was discussed. 

On April 27, Georgian parliament adopting a new resolution. It emphasized the Russian involvement in the conflict on the Abkhaz side against the Republic of Georgia. It also blamed the Supreme Soviet of Russian Federation for adopting resolutions which violate Georgia's sovereignty. It stated that Russia was responsible for violation of the Moscow agreement and obstruction of the Sochi talks. It determined that Head of State Eduard Shevardnadze should have addressed the Russian president about withdrawal of Russian military units from Abkhazia. If Russia refused to withdraw its forces, the Georgian parliament would have proclaimed the area between the Gumista river and the Russian-Georgian border to be occupied by Russia. It called the Head of the State, Georgian Foreign Ministry and representatives in international organizations to take appropriate steps.

On May 14, Yeltsin and Shevardnadze met to negotiate a settlement in Abkhazia and sign a ceasefire agreement. Georgia and Russia agreed that all Russian military forces will withdraw from Georgia by the end of 1995. On May 20, a ceasefire agreement was signed in Moscow. 

On 27 July, a new ceasefire was signed in Sochi. The gradual demilitarization of the area should have taken place. A Russian-Georgian-Abkhaz control group should have been established to monitor the ceasefire. Georgian military forces began withdrawing from the conflict area on August 26.

On 16 September, the ceasefire was again violated and the battles resumed. The Abkhaz offensive aimed to capture Sokhumi. On 17 September, Georgian leadership met with Foreign Minister of Russia Pavel Grachev. He proposed two Russian divisions to enter Sokhumi to secure peace. Georgian side refused. 

Russia adopted a resolution about violation of the 27 July agreement. It said that if Abkhaz side once again failed to fulfill the terms of agreement, actions would have been taken against them in accordance with the international law and Russia would have suspended supply of energy to Abkhazia. Yet Russian armed forces helped the Abkhaz in their offensive.

On September 28, after Georgians lost control over the Sokhumi, Shevardnadze claimed that Russian military authorities masterminded the Abkhaz rebel attack on Sukhumi. He blamed anti-Yeltsin reactionary group in Russian establishment for fighting against Georgia. In a letter to the UN, Shevardnadze referred to Russia as "the evil empire".

After the war

In the aftermath of the military setback in Abkhazia in 1993, the forces loyal to Zviad Gamsakhurdia, first president of Georgia who was ousted as a result of the 1991–1992 Georgian coup d'état, launched insurgency against the demoralized and unpopular government of Eduard Shevardnadze. In exchange for Russian military support against them, Shevardnadze agreed to join the Commonwealth of Independent States and legitimize the Russian military bases in Georgia: Vaziani Military Base, Gudauta, Akhalkalaki and Batumi. 2,000 Russian troops were deployed to Georgia. Gamsakhurdia's rebellion was finally crushed in December 1993.

After Georgia agreed to join the CIS, relations between Russia and Georgia began to improve. Free trade agreements between Russia and Georgia were signed in 1993 and 1994. Russia supported economic sanctions on Abkhazia, based on a unanimous decision by the 12 presidents of the CIS member countries in January 1996 to ban trade, financial, transportation, communications, and other ties with Abkhazia at the state level – by ministries and state-owned entities in the member countries. Georgian President Eduard Shevardnadze persuaded Russian counterpart Boris Yeltsin to push through that decision and all the CIS member countries supported it.

At the Organization for Security and Co-operation in Europe Istanbul Summit of November 1999, agreement was reached that the Russian military bases in Georgia would all be evacuated by Russia before July 1, 2001.

Vaziani was handed over on June 29, 2001. Akhalkalaki was not handed over until June 27, 2007, and Batumi on November 13, 2007. Being in Abkhazia, the base at Gudauta has never been under the control of Georgia.

Russia dominated the collective peacekeeping missions in Abkhazia and South Ossetia but was criticized by Georgia, and by several Western diplomats, for failing to maintain neutrality in the conflict zones.

Russia accused Georgia of helping Chechen separatists, and some supplies and reinforcements indeed reached the rebels via Georgian territory. The separatists also took refuge in the Pankisi Gorge in eastern Georgia. After Russia had threatened to launch cross-border attacks against them in 2002, the Georgian government took steps to establish order there with help from the USA.

Relations after the Rose Revolution (2003–present)

Rose Revolution

Abkhazia

Speaking in a 2006 interview with a Russian newspaper, Georgian Foreign Minister Gela Bezhuashvili said that Georgia would try to create channels for "direct dialogue" with Abkhazia and South Ossetia alongside existing negotiating formats. "Russia has lost its role as a mediator in the Georgian–Abkhazian conflict, Georgians are not Russian people" according to Bezhuashvili. He also said that UN monitoring of the Kodori Gorge, which was suspended three years earlier, could resume within "two or three weeks" once security has been established. The following is the text of the interview published by Vremya Novostey on 4 August:

The Georgian Foreign Ministry accuses Russian peacemakers of inactivity in the conflict zone of Abkhazia. "Russian peacekeepers continue to act in defiance of their mandated obligations, turning a blind eye to gross violation of law and human rights taking place in their very presence", according to the Georgian Foreign Ministry.

According to the 2005–06 agreements, the withdrawal of Russian forces from Georgia was completed by January 1, 2008.

Russian ban of Georgian wines

Spying row

Georgian–Russian relations deteriorated seriously during the September–October 2006 Georgia–Russia spying row, when Georgia detained four Russian officers on spying charges. Russia responded by imposing economic sanctions on Georgia and withdrawing its embassy from Tbilisi.

Deportation of Georgians

During the spying row, the Russian authorities started to deport Georgian citizens from Russia on charges of visa violations. The government of Georgia as well as influential human rights organizations such as Freedom House and Human Rights Watch accused the Russian authorities of "tolerating and encouraging the mistreatments of immigrants from Georgia and other Caucasus countries." and of "a deliberate campaign to detain and expel thousands of Georgians living in Russia." On 27 March 2007, Georgia filed an interstate lawsuit with the European Court of Human Rights over the cases of violations of the European Convention for the Protection of Human Rights and Fundamental Freedoms in the course of the deportation of Georgian citizens from Russia in the autumn of 2006. Russia described this as a "new unfriendly step taken against Russia".

Alleged air space violations

Helicopter attack incident

In March, a village in the Georgian controlled area of Abkhazia was attacked by three Russian helicopters, according to Georgia. Russia denied the allegations.

Tsitelubani missile incident

On August 7, 2007, a missile landed in the Georgian-controlled village of Tsitelubani, some 65 km north of Tbilisi. Georgian officials said that two Russian fighter jets violated its airspace and fired a missile, which fell on the edge of the village but did not explode. Georgian President Mikhail Saakashvili said the incident was part of a pattern of Russian aggression against its neighbors and urged European states to condemn Moscow. Georgia claimed to have radar evidence proving that the invading aircraft flew in from Russia and said that the strike had aimed, unsuccessfully, at destroying radar equipment recently installed near the South Ossetian conflict zone.

South Ossetian separatist leader Eduard Kokoity described the incident as "a provocation staged by the Georgian side, aimed at discrediting Russia", claiming that another bomb fell in South Ossetia. In his words, "a Georgian military plane crossed into South Ossetia on Monday, performed manoeuvres above Ossetian villages and dropped two bombs."

Russia also denied the Georgian claim. and said that Georgian jets may have fired the missile on their own territory as a way of provoking tensions in the region and derailing a session of the Joint Control Commission on Georgian–South Ossetian Conflict Resolution. Georgia immediately denounced the claim as absurd. South Ossetian officials as well as two Georgian opposition politicians also suggested that the Georgian authorities might have been behind the incident.

Plane downing incident

The 2007 Georgia plane downing incident refers to the possible downing, by Georgia's anti-aircraft system, of a military plane that violated Georgia's air space on August 21, 2007. While it is still not confirmed by Georgia whether the plane was downed, Abkhazia's break-away government confirmed that a plane went down, but denies that it was shot down.

September 2007 controversy over the Russian ambassador's statement
On September 24, 2007, the Russian ambassador to Georgia, Vyacheslav Kovalenko, became embroiled in a controversy over his statement at a televised informal meeting with Georgian intellectuals organized by the Tbilisi-based Russian–Georgian Friendship Union in which he referred to the Georgian people as a "dying-out nation", and announced to the Georgians that they will soon become extinct in the face of globalization while Russia is "a large country, a huge country. It can digest this. You, the Georgians, will fail to digest this."

The statements sparked public outrage in Georgia, and Kovalenko was summoned by Georgia's Ministry of Foreign Affairs for explanations while the opposition factions in the Parliament of Georgia demanded the withdrawal of Kovalenko from Georgia. Georgian Parliamentary Chairperson, Nino Burjanadze, responded to the ambassador's prediction: "Maybe, certain forces in Russia really want to see the extinction of Georgian nation, but this will not happen... I would advise Mr. Kovalenko to think about Russia and its demographic problems and we will ourselves take care of Georgian problems, including the demographic ones."

Georgian demonstrations — alleged Russian involvement

In a televised address on the day of clashes between protesters and police in Tbilisi on November 7, 2007, Saakashvili said his country faced "a very serious threat of unrest". "High-ranking officials in Russian special services are behind this," he said, adding that he had evidence. He said several Russian diplomats would be expelled from Georgia for engaging in "espionage". Earlier he had recalled Georgia's ambassador to Moscow, Irakly Chubinishvili, for "consultations".

2008 crisis

April 2008 Georgian drone downing incident
On April 20, 2008 a Georgian unarmed aerial vehicle (UAV) was shot down over the Abkhazian conflict zone.

However, Georgia's defence ministry released video the next day showing what appears to be a Russian MiG-29 shooting down the unarmed Georgian drone. According to Georgia the jet came from Gudauta and then returned to Russia. Moscow denied Georgia's accusation and stressed that none of its planes were in the region at the time. Furthermore, the Russian Ministry of Foreign Affairs issued a statement accusing Georgia of violating the 1994 Moscow agreement and United Nations resolutions on Abkhazia by deploying without authorisation a UAV (which also can be used to direct fire) in the Security Zone and the Restricted Weapons Zone.

On April 24, a closed-door U.N. Security Council emergency session, convened at Georgia's request, failed to resolve the dispute, but the U.S., the United Kingdom, France and Germany issued a joint statement expressing their concern over Russia's recent moves in Abkhazia and calling Moscow to reverse or not to implement its decision to legalize the ties with Abkhazia and South Ossetia. The Russian ambassador to the U.N., Vitaly Churkin, called the demand by the Western states "a tall order" and stressed that Russia had no intention of reversing its plans.

Although Moscow denies that a MiG-class fighter was involved in the incident, the Russian envoy to NATO, Dmitry Rogozin, has suggested that a MiG-29 belonging to a NATO member might have downed the Georgian spy plane. In response, NATO Secretary General Jaap de Hoop Scheffer reportedly remarked that he would "eat his tie if it turned out that a NATO MiG-29 had magically appeared in Abkhazia and shot down a Georgian drone."

On May 26, 2008, the U.N. mission released the conclusion of its independent investigation into the incident. It confirmed that the Georgian video footage and radar data were authentic and the jet which destroyed the drone was indeed Russian. The concluding report said that the jet flew towards the Russian territory after the incident, but it was unclear where the attacker took off, naming the Gudauta base as a possible locality. The mission also noted that "a reconnaissance mission by a military aircraft, whether manned or unmanned, constituted 'military action' and therefore contravened the ceasefire accord". Georgia hailed the report, but Russia dismissed it.

Military buildup in Abkhazia
The UAV incident triggered a new rise in tensions between the two countries. Russia accused Georgia of trying to exploit the NATO support to solve the Abkhazia problem by force and of sending its troops into the Georgia-controlled upper Kodori Valley in northeast Abkhazia. However, the U.N. monitors in Abkhazia stated earlier in April they did not observe any military buildup on either side of the demilitarization line. On April 29, Russia announced it would increase its military presence in the region and threatened to retaliate militarily against Georgia's efforts. According to the Russian Ministry of Defense, it increased the number of its peacekeepers in Abkhazia to 2,542 peacekeepers, which is 458 short of the 3,000 limit set by agreement. The Georgian Prime Minister Lado Gurgenidze said Georgia would treat any additional troops in Abkhazia as aggressors, while President Saakashvili, in his televised address, pledged to pursue only a peaceful line in the conflict areas and called upon the Abkhaz and Ossetians to unite with Georgia in defying attempts by "outrageous and irresponsible external force to trigger bloodshed". The European Union also urged caution, saying that to increase troop numbers would be "unwise" given current tensions, while the United States called on Russia "to reconsider some provocative steps" it had taken in respect of Georgia's breakaway region Abkhazia. Georgia also suspended the talks regarding Russia's admission to the World Trade Organization (WTO) and threatened to veto the process. Georgian officials claim Russia is changing facts on the ground in order to make it impossible for NATO foreign ministers to give Georgia a Membership Action Plan when they meet in December 2008. In the meantime, the Russian Cossacks and North Caucasian mountaineers declared their readiness to fight Georgia again in the case of a renewed confrontation in Abkhazia as they did early in the 1990s. On May 6, 2008, the Georgian state minister for reintegration Temur Iakobashvili said Georgia was on the verge of war with Russia. Georgia requested the U.N. mission to inquire into the number and deployment of the Russian peacekeeping troops in Abkhazia. The Russian Ministry of Defense claimed that the chief U.N. observer "agreed that actions by the Russian side do not contradict basic agreements on the conduct of the peacekeeping operation", but the mission later responded to this statement, declaring that it "has no authority to pronounce on the conformity between the CIS peacekeeping operation in the Zone of the Georgian-Abkhaz Conflict and CIS rules."

Early in May 2008, both Russian and Abkhaz sides claimed that three more Georgian reconnaissance drones were shot over Abkhazia, and declared that Georgia was preparing to mount an offensive into the region in the near future. The Abkhaz foreign minister Sergei Shamba asked Russia to place Abkhazia under Russia's military control in exchange for security guarantees. Georgia denied these allegations, stating that it was "a provocation aimed at propagandistic support of Russia's military intervention."

Russo-Georgian War

On August 8, 2008, after weeks of rising tensions Georgian troops tried to retake the breakaway province and launched an offensive, including heavy bombardment of Tskhinvali. Russian forces entered South Ossetia and Abkhazia. After four days of intense fighting, Georgian forces were expelled from South Ossetia and Abkhazia. Russian paratroopers raided Georgian bases from Abkhazia. The Russian Air Force bombed military and logistical targets inside Georgia, and the Russian Navy entered Abkhazian waters and defeated Georgian Naval Forces in a brief skirmish. Both sides agreed to a ceasefire on August 12, but the next day Russia violated that ceasefire, sending regular and paramilitary forces into Georgia proper. The Georgian Army retreated to defend Tbilisi, and the Russians took the main highway and the cities of Poti and Gori without a fight, removing or destroying any military equipment left behind, and set up "buffer zones" around the Abkhazian and South Ossetian borders, gradually withdrawing.

Georgia's military strength was damaged, but quickly recovered, having reached a strength greater than pre-war levels in 2010. Russia stationed additional forces in South Ossetia and Abkhazia, and built new military bases there.

Recognition of breakaway regions and severance of diplomatic relations

On 25 August 2008, the Federal Assembly of Russia unanimously voted to urge President Medvedev to recognize Abkhazia and South Ossetia as independent states. On the following day, Medvedev agreed, signing a decree officially recognizing the two entities. Georgia has rejected this move outright as an annexation of its territory; In response to Russia's recognition of Abkhazia and South Ossetia, the Georgian government announced that the country cut all diplomatic relations with Russia. Russia had already closed its embassy right after the beginning of the war in South Ossetia in August 2008 before diplomatic relations between the two countries ended.

Normalization
After the 2008 war, efforts were made to normalize relations between Russia and Georgia. In 2008, the Geneva International Discussions were established to enable security dialogue between Russia and Georgia mediated by the EU, the UN and the OSCE. Geneva process brought together representatives of Georgia, Russia, Georgia's breakaway Abkhazia and South Ossetia and the United States. In 2010, Georgia-Russia border crossing point at Zemo Larsi was reopened. In November 2011, a Georgian–Russian deal allowed Russia to proceed with its World Trade Organization (WTO) application. In February 2012, Georgian President Mikheil Saakashvili introduced visa-free regime for Russians visiting Georgia for 90 days. The time period was later extended to 1 year. In December 2012, Russian and Georgian representatives met in Prague and had the first two-way discussions after the war. In June 2013, Russia lifted the embargo on Georgian wine. Georgia resumed wine exports to Russia for the first time since 2006. In an attempt to improve relations, several Russian government-sponsored actors strengthened their presence in Georgia. In 2013, the Primakov Russian-Georgian/Georgian-Russian Public Center was founded  with the support of the Gorchakov Fund. Also, opportunities to enhance people-to-people contacts have come from the Russkiy Mir Foundation, providing financial support to Georgian organisations through its grant program. 

In March 2014, Georgia condemned the Russian annexation of Crimea, voicing support for Ukraine. Georgia imposed a ban on trade and financial transactions with Crimea alongside the European Union. However, it did not join Ukraine and Western countries in imposing wide-ranging sanctions on Moscow. By avoiding other sanctions, Georgia averted reciprocal steps by Russia.

In 2014, Russia has invited the Georgian President Giorgi Margvelashvili to visit Moscow. In an effort to thaw frozen conflicts over Abkhazia and South Ossetia, Georgia asked if they could be on the agenda for bilateral talks. The proposal was repeated in 2015. In both cases Moscow demurred and the visits never took place. 

In October 2014, direct, regular flights between Georgia and Russia resumed. In 2015, Russian President Vladimir Putin stated that Moscow was ready to lift visa requirement for Georgia. After few days, Russia simplified visa procedures for Georgian citizens.

On March 9, 2018, Georgian Prime Minister Giorgi Kvirikashvili made a statement about readiness of Georgia to normalize bilateral relations with Moscow. Kvirikashvili's proposal never went forward. 

Despite relative success in terms of trade and tourism, as well as the resultant stability in the conflict area, which has helped to lower risks of a new military conflict between the two countries, the normalization failed to bring an end to the disputes over the breakaway regions. This led to public frustration in Georgia with the dialogue with Russia. The public survey showed that only 40 per cent of Georgians supported dialogue with Russia in a sharp contrast with the 83 per cent who backed it at the start of normalization. Georgian diplomant Zurab Abashidze has noted: "When we launched the new so-called Prague format in 2012... we, of course, wanted to restore both trade and transport links and solve humanitarian problems. But internally, emotionally, people expected that, having restored these practical ties, all these would somehow contribute to the solution of the most complex problems related to the territorial integrity of Georgia. That did not happen".

Protests of 2019 and aftermath
 

On June 20, 2019, protests began to break out surrounding Georgia's parliament building over the visit of Russian politician Sergei Gavrilov, who was taking part in the Interparliamentary Assembly on Orthodoxy — an inter-parliamentary institution set up by the Greek parliament to foster relationships between Orthodox Christian lawmakers. This in the aftermath of a speech given by Gavrilov in Russian from the Speaker's chair in Georgia's parliament building, extolling the Orthodox brotherhood of Georgia and Russia. The protests grew violent and Georgian police suppressed them with tear gas and rubber bullets. The ensuing protests would result in a straining of relations between the two countries. Russia, in an apparent response, halted direct flights between the countries and increased regulation on Georgia's main exports to Russia, wine and mineral water.

Russia banned direct passenger flights between Russia and Georgia starting July 8, citing  "the need to ensure a sufficient level of aviation security". Indirect flights through Minsk, Istanbul, Baku, and Yerevan remain, as well as the land border between the two countries.

In late August 2019, the first serious crisis occurred in South Ossetia following the 2008 war after the Georgian government built a police checkpoint close to the line of separation to prevent Russian and South Ossetian border guards from installing fencing on Georgian-controlled territory in the village of Chorchana. South Ossetian authorities demanded from Georgia to dismantle the police outpost and threatened to take it by force. Georgian government refused. In September 2019 the Russian and Georgian foreign ministers met together in an attempt to defuse the tensions. However, they failed to reach an agreement, and the Incident Prevention and Response Mechanisms in South Ossetia (subsidiary dialogue format of the Geneva International Discussions) has stopped working for one year. The Georgian police outpost remained in place. The de facto South Ossetian leadership further threatened to attack the Georgian police and take it over.

Russia–Ukraine crisis 

In December 2021, Russia condemned NATO's eastward expansion and forwarded to its leadership security demands, specifically to never admit Georgia as well as Ukraine to the alliance. In early February 2022, the Georgian parliament adopted a supportive resolution for Ukraine amid the Russian military build-up at its border, expressing concerns over the possible military escalation. During the 2022 Russian invasion of Ukraine, Georgia supported Ukraine diplomatically and politically. During the first four months following the outbreak of war, Georgia has joined more than 260 resolutions and statements condemning Russia's actions. However, Georgia refused to join international sanctions against Russia. Therefore, despite otherwise hostile relations, Russia has not put Georgia on its Unfriendly Countries List.

Russian immigration wave into Georgia, 2022 

In September 2022 alone 222,274 people entered Georgia from Russia, according to the Georgian Ministry of Internal Affairs.

The arrival of Russians made real estate prices skyrocket in Tbilisi; in November 2022, average real estate prices were 210% higher than 1 year prior. An important factor in this is that Russian migrants, often wealthy, are ready to pay much higher sums than Georgians for apartments. 

This has rendered rent unaffordable for Georgian locals, exacerbating pre-existing tensions between Russians and Georgians.

Other causes of tension are the fact that 20% of Georgian territory is occupied by Russia (making Georgians – at best – feel they owe nothing to Russians) and frequent nuisance caused by Russian immigrants, such as aggressive behavior, demanding to be served in Russian, to be allowed to pay in Russian ruble, etc.

Screenshots of alleged Russian users (from a large Telegram group of people crossing the Russo-Georgian border) complaining they were not allowed entry into Georgia because of Z signs on their cars went viral on the Georgian and Ukrainian internet.

In October 2022, protests were held demanding the introduction of a visa regime with Russia in order to mitigate the socio-economic damage caused by the migration, with the ruling Georgian Dream party dismissing such a step as "irrational".

The FSB has sent agents to infiltrate Georgia amidst the emigration wave. Once exposed, the news "barely makes a ripple" in Georgia's media.

The ever increasing number of Russians in Georgia – many thousands of them renting postal addresses in remote Georgian villages for businesses previously registered in Russia – is seen by many Georgians as a trojan horse, rising fears that the country will become more economically dependent on Russia, more vulnerable to blackmail by Moscow, and that the war in Ukraine will drag on due to sanctions being avoided in countries like Georgia. For this reason, Georgians who help Russians take root in Georgia have been publicly upbraided as collaborators and traitors.

Further reading

Ammon, Philipp: "Die Wurzeln des georgisch-russischen Konflikts (1783–1832) 
Ammon, Philipp: Georgien zwischen Eigenstaatlichkeit und russischer Okkupation: Die Wurzeln des russisch-georgischen Konflikts vom 18. Jahrhundert bis zum Ende der ersten georgischen Republik (1921), Kitab, Klagenfurt 2015, 
 
Zakareishvili, Paata: "The North Caucasus: Bone of Contention or a Basis for Russian–Georgian Cooperation?" in the Caucasus Analytical Digest No. 27

See also
Foreign relations of Georgia (country)
Foreign relations of Russia
Georgia–Russia border
Proposed Russian annexation of South Ossetia
Georgia–Commonwealth of Independent States relations
Georgia–Ukraine relations

References

 
Russia
Bilateral relations of Russia
Relations of colonizer and former colony